Melgaço is a Brazilian municipality in the state of Pará. It stands at an altitude of 12 meters. Its population was estimated in 2020 at 27,890 inhabitants, according to the IBGE.

It is located 290 km, in a straight line, from the capital of the state. It borders Portel, Breves, Bagre, Gurupá and Porto de Moz.

The hymn and seal of the municipality were composed by Francisco de Oliveira e Souza.

The Estação Científica Ferreira Pena (Ferreira Pena Science Station) is located in the rural area of Melgaço, on a river named Curuá, a tributary of the  Caxiuanã.

References

Municipalities in Pará